The St. Thomas City Council is the governing body of the city of St. Thomas, Ontario, Canada. It is made up of a mayor and seven aldermen who are elected on an "at-large" basis. Elections for the city council are held every four years.

2006-2010 City Council
Elected in the municipal elections of 2006 for St. Thomas, Ontario, Canada.  It served the city from December 1, 2006 – November 30, 2010.

 Mayor Cliff Barwick
 Heather Jackson-Chapman
 Bill Aarts
 Gord Campbell
 Tom Johnston
 Terry Shackelton
 Lori Baldwin-Sands
 David Warden

2010-2014 City Council
Elected in the municipal elections of 2010 for St. Thomas, Ontario, Canada.

 Mayor Heather Jackson
 Lori Baldwin-Sands
 Gord Campbell
 Mark Cosens
 Tom Johnston
 Jeff Kohler
 David Warden
 Sam Yusuf

Alderman Sam Yusuf stepped down from council April 24, 2013. On May 6, 2013, council appointed Cliff Barwick to council to fill the vacancy.

External links 
 St. Thomas City Council information
 St. Thomas City Council

Municipal councils in Ontario
St. Thomas, Ontario